Swift Bird is a census-designated place (CDP) on the Cheyenne River Indian Reservation in Dewey County, South Dakota, United States. It was first listed as a CDP prior to the 2020 census. The population of the CDP was 117 at the 2020 census.

Demographics

References 

Census-designated places in Dewey County, South Dakota
Census-designated places in South Dakota